The South African Indian Congress (SAIC) was an organisation founded in 1921 in Natal (now KwaZulu-Natal), South Africa. The congress is famous for its strong participation by Mahatma Gandhi and other prominent South African Indian figures during the time. Umar Hajee Ahmed Jhaveri was elected the first president of the South African Indian Congress. The SAIC was a member of the Congress Alliance.

See also
 Natal Indian Congress

References
 ANC Description of the South African Indian Congress
 The Organization's Beginnings

Anti-Apartheid organisations
Defunct civic and political organisations in South Africa
Organizations established in 1924
1924 establishments in South Africa
Indian diaspora in South Africa